The 1976 PBA First Conference Finals was the best-of-5 basketball championship series of the 1976 PBA First Conference, and the conclusion of the conference's playoffs. The defending champion Toyota Comets and Crispa Redmanizers played in the finals for the fourth straight time.

The Crispa Redmanizers won their second straight championship, winning their series against the Toyota Comets, three games to one.

Qualification

Games summary

Broadcast notes

References

External links
 Crispa-Toyota rivalry

1976 PBA season
Crispa Redmanizers games
Toyota Super Corollas games
1976
Crispa–Toyota rivalry
PBA First Conference Finals